Ballantyne Pier (also called the Ballantyne Cruise Terminal) is a commercial and passenger dock of the Port of Vancouver, Canada, located at 851 Centennial Road.  It sits at the west side of Rogers Sugar across the Canadian Pacific Railway tracks from Powell Street.  Passenger terminal access is via Clark Drive or McGill Street Overpass only.

The dock is equipped with two automatic gangways and a terminal building with baggage handling and customs areas.

The pier stopped cruise operations at the end of 2014.

See also
 Canada Place, the main cruise ship terminal in Vancouver.

References and footnotes

Canadian Pacific Railway
Buildings and structures in Vancouver
Piers in Canada
Transport buildings and structures in British Columbia